Liangcoris is a monotypic genus of assassin bugs (family Reduviidae), in the subfamily Harpactorinae, native to China, containing a single species, Liangcoris yangae.

References

Reduviidae
Cimicomorpha genera
Monotypic Hemiptera genera
Hemiptera of Asia